Paha is a settlement in Novo Mesto, Slovenia.

Paha or PAHA may also refer to:
 PAHA or para-aminohippuric acid
 Paha (landform), a hill or ridge, typically formed of sand and capped with loess
 Paha language, a Kra language spoken in northern Guangnan County, Wenshan Prefecture, Yunnan
 Paha (beetle), a genus of cylindrical bark beetle
 a demon cohort of Lempo, from Finnish mythology
 a minor-planet moon of 47171 Lempo
 Paha, Washington, an unincorporated community

People with the surname
 Isaac Paha, Ghanaian football coach